Amir Abu Nil (born 27 February 1989) is an Arab-Israeli footballer currently playing for Ihud Bnei Shefa-'Amr.

External links
Player pag – Reds

1989 births
Living people
Israeli footballers
Hapoel Haifa F.C. players
Maccabi Ahi Nazareth F.C. players
Hapoel Acre F.C. players
Hapoel Rishon LeZion F.C. players
Ironi Nesher F.C. players
Hapoel Bnei Lod F.C. players
Hapoel Kaukab F.C. players
F.C. Daburiyya players
Maccabi Bnei Reineh F.C. players
Israeli Premier League players
Liga Leumit players
Footballers from I'billin
Association football midfielders